Drago Marin Cherina (born 1949) is a Croatian sculpting artist, who was naturalized Australian in the years 1970.

Life and career

Cherina was born in Korčula, Croatia. He moved to England, where he worked as an assistant to Henry Moore. He came to Australia in 1975 to do a bust of Prime Minister, Gough Whitlam, and liked the place so much he arranged to be naturalized in Gough's office. He currently lives in Taiwan.

Works

Notable works include The Mathy a bronze statuette awarded to the annual winner of the IFAC Australian Singing Competition and a bust of Alexander Solzhenitsyn that is held at the National Library of Australia.

A bronze sculpture of cellist Jacqueline du Pré, by Cherina, was installed at the Kensington Park Community Centre in Kensington, Sydney, in 2018.

A bust of Mahatma Gandhi is installed in Shanghai's New Town Central Park.

A 6 metre high, six tonne abstract artwork depicting prolific sculptor Henry Moore located in Banjo Paterson Bush Park in Yeoval, New South Wales, Australia.

References

External links
Cherina.cn

Living people
Croatian artists
1949 births
Croatian emigrants to Australia